Slide is the second extended play by Canadian country artist Madeline Merlo. It was released on September 23, 2022, via Wheelhouse Records, and marks Merlo's debut release in the United States. She co-wrote every song on the project.

Background and promotion
Merlo signed with the BBR Music Group in 2020 and took extra time to write songs before releasing the extended play. She felt that she initially put too much pressure on herself, before refocusing with the help of her new producer Zach Crowell. She remarked that it "started to start to sound like me and this kind of next step and evolution that I was hoping for," after some time and that the title track "Slide" was the first song that "felt right". The songs are intended to be included on a full-length album, with Merlo remarking that she wanted to "tease what the rest of the album would be like". She was very thankful that her label gave her "the trust and time to pursue" the sound she wanted.

Merlo performed a live acoustic version of the title track on KTLA as part of their "Music Fest Friday" series on September 30, 2022.

Content
The title track "Slide" was co-written with American country artist Sam Hunt alongside Crowell and Jerry Flowers. They had intended for the song to be for Hunt, but felt early on during the writing process that it was more of a feminine song, and Crowell asked Merlo if she was interested in joining them to finish the song. In regard to "YOUNG-ish," Merlo stated that she is "passionate about writing songs with strong female characters." "Girl Where He Grew Up" was not meant to be included on the EP, but after it received plenty of attention on TikTok earlier in the year, Merlo decided to ask her label to replace the original track four with it, which they agreed to do.

Critical reception
Erica Zisman of Country Swag reviewed the project favourably, saying Merlo "manages to showcase her songwriting chops and her killer vocals," adding that "each and every song is methodically placed," and that it was "the perfect introduction for new fans and audiences in American country music." James Daykin of Entertainment Focus also gave a positive review of Slide, writing that Merlo "delivers powerful female stories, from budding romances to growing up to the lessons learned in-between." Stephen Andrew of PopCulture stated that the four songs "are incredibly eclectic examples of pop-flavored country."

Track listing

Personnel
Adapted from AllMusic.

 Nick Autry - engineering
 Nathan Chapman - production, composition, electric guitar, keyboard
 Jim Cooley - engineering
 Zach Crowell - composition, keyboard, production, programming, recording, background vocals
 Jerry Flowers - composition, electric guitar, production, background vocals
 Ashley Gorley - composition
 Kenny Greenberg - electric guitar
 Sam Hunt - composition
 Scott Johnson - project coordinator
 Zach Kuhlman - engineering
 Hillary Lindsey - composing, background vocals
 Sol Littlefield - electric guitar
 Devin Malone - acoustic guitar, electric guitar, mandolin
 Joel McKenney - engineering
 Andrew Mendelson - engineering
 Madeline Merlo - composition, vocals
 Jon Nite - composition
 Josh Osborne - composition
 Danny Radar - acoustic guitar
 Scott Sanders - guitar, pedal steel guitar
 Jimmy Lee Sloas - bass guitar
 Aaron Sterling - drums
 Nir Z - drums

Release history

References

2022 EPs
Madeline Merlo EPs
BBR Music Group EPs
Albums produced by Zach Crowell